Cristian Mutton (born 6 January 1999) is an Italian professional footballer who plays as forward for  club Pontedera.

Career 
Mutton played in Como's youth sector until January 2017. He made his first appearance in the first team on 7 December 2016, in a 1–0 win against Lupa Roma. In that month, he moved to Inter Milan where he helped the team to won the under-19s league and the Supercoppa Primavera. On 13 August 2018, he moved to Giana Erminio. Mutton made his debut for Giana Erminio on 23 September 2018, in a 2–1 loss against Imolese. Mutton made his first goal for Giana Erminio, on 5 May 2019, in a 3–3 draw against Vis Pesaro. In the 202021 season he moved to Pro Sesto 2013 he made 2 goals in 32 appearances. He made his debut for the team on 28 September 2020, in a 2–1 loss against Juventus U23. On 1 November, he scored his first goal for the team in a 3–0 win against Novara. On 7 June 2021, Mutton moved to Pontedera.

References

External links 
 
 

1999 births
Living people
Sportspeople from Como
Footballers from Lombardy
Italian footballers
Association football forwards
Serie C players
Como 1907 players
Inter Milan players
Bologna F.C. 1909 players
A.S. Giana Erminio players
S.S.D. Pro Sesto players
U.S. Città di Pontedera players